Kerrith Brown (born 11 July 1962) is a retired judoka from the United Kingdom and President of the International Mixed Martial Arts Federation (IMMAF).

Judo career

As an athlete
Brown was a six times champion of Great Britain, winning the British Judo Championships in 1979, 1980, 1982, 1983, 1987 and 1990, over three different weight categories.

He represented Great Britain at the 1984 Summer Olympics in Los Angeles, where he claimed the bronze medal in the men's lightweight division, alongside Brazil's Luis Onmura. In 1986, he won the gold medal in the 71kg weight category at the judo demonstration sport event as part of the 1986 Commonwealth Games. At the 1988 Summer Olympics in Seoul, South Korea, he competed in the lightweight division again winning a bronze medal but after the competition he tested positive for use of a controlled substance (furosemide) and was disqualified and stripped of the medal.

Managerial
On 12 October 2012, Kerrith Brown was elected as the new Chairman of the British Judo Association by the British Judo membership, assuming the role at the BJA Annual General Meeting that took place on Saturday 10 November. Under his leadership, the British Judo Association opened its doors for its Centre of Excellence at the University of Wolverhampton in 2013. Also under his leadership, the British Judo Association's rights to the 2015 European Judo Championships were revoked by the European Judo Union and the event cancelled, eight weeks before it was scheduled to take place in Glasgow. The event cancellation was prompted by a disagreement over title sponsorship by mixed martial arts promoter, Ultimate Fighting Championship (UFC), in which the EJU cited the brand as not meeting "EJU values" . Kerrith Brown then resigned as Chairman of the British Judo Association "due to ideological differences with the leadership of the European Judo Union and the International Judo Federation and to ensure the best interests of British Judo"

IMMAF
Brown was elected as president of the International Mixed Martial Arts Federation(IMMAF), following election by unanimous board vote in Berlin on 20 June 2015.

References

External links
 

British male judoka
Judoka at the 1984 Summer Olympics
Judoka at the 1988 Summer Olympics
Olympic judoka of Great Britain
Olympic bronze medallists for Great Britain
1962 births
Living people
Place of birth missing (living people)
Black British sportsmen
Olympic medalists in judo
Medalists at the 1984 Summer Olympics
Goodwill Games medalists in judo
Competitors at the 1986 Goodwill Games
Doping cases in judo
Competitors stripped of Summer Olympics medals